The following is a list of Finnish billionaires. It is based on an annual assessment of wealth and assets compiled and published by Forbes magazine in 2022. Finland has seven billionaires as of 2022.

2022 Finns billionaires list

See also
 Forbes list of billionaires
 List of countries by the number of billionaires

References

Lists of people by wealth
Net worth
Economy of Finland-related lists